Bubur ayam (Indonesian for "chicken congee") is an Indonesian chicken congee. It is rice congee with shredded chicken meat served with some condiments, such as chopped scallion, crispy fried shallot, celery, tongcay (preserved salted vegetables), fried soybean,  crullers (youtiao, known as cakwe in Indonesia), and both salty and sweet soy sauce, and sometimes topped with yellow chicken broth and kerupuk (Indonesian-style crackers). Unlike many other Indonesian dishes, it is not spicy; sambal or chili paste is served separately. It is a favourite breakfast food, served by humble travelling vendors, warung (small local shops), fast food establishments, and five-star hotel restaurants. Travelling bubur ayam vendors frequently pass through residential streets in the morning selling the dish.

Origin and variations 

The origin of bubur ayam was derived from Chinese chicken congee. The traces of Chinese cuisine influences are the use of cakwe (youtiao), tongcay and soy sauce. Bubur ayam employs a wide range of poultry products, such as shredded chicken meat for the main dish and different dishes made with chicken offal as side delicacies. Bubur ayam is often eaten with the addition of boiled chicken egg, chicken liver, gizzard, intestines and uritan (premature chicken eggs acquired from butchered hens), served as satay. There are some variants of bubur ayam, such as bubur ayam Bandung and bubur ayam Sukabumi, both from West Java. The later variant uses raw telur ayam kampung (lit. "village chicken egg", i.e. free-range eggs) buried under the hot rice congee to allow the egg to be half-cooked, with the other ingredients on top of the rice congee. The recipe and condiments of bubur ayam served by travelling vendors and warung are also slightly different with those served in fast food establishments or hotel restaurants.

Because this food is always served hot and with a soft texture, like soto ayam and nasi tim, bubur ayam is known as comfort food in Indonesian culture. The soft texture of the rice congee and boneless chicken also makes this dish suitable for young children or adults in convalescence. Because of its popularity, bubur ayam has become one of the Asia-inspired fast food menu items at McDonald's Indonesia and Malaysia, and also at Kentucky Fried Chicken Indonesia. Although almost all recipes of bubur ayam use rice, a new variation, called bubur ayam havermut, replaces rice with oats. In grocery stores, bubur ayam is also available as instant food, requiring only the addition of hot water.

Gallery

See also

 Arroz caldo
 List of porridges

References

External links 

 Bubur Ayam Sukabumi recipe (in Indonesian)
 Bubur Ayam Bandung recipe (in Indonesian)
 Bubur Ayam Jakarta recipe (in Indonesian)

Indonesian chicken dishes
Congee
Indonesian Chinese cuisine
Indonesian rice dishes
Street food in Indonesia